Pierre Senska (born 21 June 1988) is a disabled German cyclist. He won the Para-Cycling World Championships road race in the LC 4 category in Bordeaux in 2007.  He received an award for Junior Sportsman of the Year from the German Sports Aid Foundation in November 2007. He took part in the Men's LC4 3 km individual pursuit event at the 2008 Summer Paralympics held in Beijing during September 2008.

References

External links
 
 

1988 births
Living people
German male cyclists
Paralympic cyclists of Germany
Cyclists at the 2008 Summer Paralympics
Cyclists at the 2020 Summer Paralympics
UCI Para-cycling World Champions
Cyclists from Berlin
21st-century German people